Afonso Augusto Moreira Pena (30 November 1847 – 14 June 1909), often referred to simply as Afonso Pena, was a Brazilian lawyer, professor and politician who served as the 6th president of Brazil from 1906 until his death in 1909. Before his political career, Pena had been an attorney and legal scholar. He was the first president of Brazil to die in office.

Pena began his political career in 1874 with an election to the Provincial Assembly of Minas Gerais. In the succeeding years, he reconciled legislative work with some periods occupying ministries—Ministry of War (1882), Agriculture (1883 to 1884) and Justice (1885). As president of the provincial assembly of Minas Gerais, Pena inaugurated the new capital Belo Horizonte.

After the proclamation of the Republic, he was president of Minas Gerais between 1892 and 1894. It was during his administration that Belo Horizonte was set for the future state capital (which at that time was Ouro Preto). He ran in the presidential election of 1894, but lost by a large margin to Prudente de Morais.

In 1902 Pena became Vice President to Francisco de Paula Rodrigues Alves. As Vice President, he also served as the President of the Senate. He was elected president in 1906 and served until his death in 1909, a few days after the passing of his son Álvaro Pena.

Afonso Pena was the first Brazilian president to advocate intervening in the coffee economy. The federal government started to buy production surplus, thus maintaining the high price of coffee in international markets. Pena also promoted the expansion of railroads and immigration.

The reorganization of the Brazilian Army and Navy was done by ministers Hermes da Fonseca and  during the Pena administration. Pena also supported Cândido Rondon's expeditions in the Amazon rainforest.

Early life and education 
Born on 30 November 1847 in Santa Bárbara do Mato Dentro, currently the municipality of Santa Bárbara, Minas Gerais, Pena was the seventh of twelve children of Domingos José Teixeira Penna and Anna Moreira Teixeira Penna; being his mother's firstborn, as she was his father's second wife. Domingos was a Portuguese immigrant from São Salvador da Ribeira de Pena and in the new country he owned land, a gold mine and a large number of slaves. While initially following a military career in the National Guard, Domingos later abandoned it; his earnings were sufficient to provide the family with a standard of living described as "comfortable". Afonso's mother came from an influential family in Santa Bárbara politics. Thus, Afonso's family was part the Minas Gerais' elite. As a child, he was taken care of by the nursemaid Ambrosina, a slave. According to José Anchieta da Silva, one of his biographers, Pena was an early abolitionist who fought for better working conditions for his father's slaves.

The school was maintained by the Lazarist priests and Pena's father was one of its most prominent contributors. At the school, he had theology, ethics, philosophy, mathematics, geometry, history, rhetoric and foreign language classes. Pena finished his studies in the Caraça School on 16 January 1864 and later moved to the city of São Paulo to study at the Faculty of Law in 1866.

Personal life and views

At the Faculty of Law 
During his studies at the Faculty of Law, Pena was a colleague of Ruy Barbosa, Joaquim Nabuco, Castro Alves and Rodrigues Alves. With the latter, he founded the journal Imprensa Acadêmica, focused on debating academic and political issues. From the few remaining copies of this journal's articles it is possible to point out the influence of French authors such as Victor Hugo, Honoré de Balzac and Émile Zola. This association helped students that could not afford to pay for their studies at the Faculty.

Pena was an adept of the natural law ideas and an opponent of positivism, as he was a fervent catholic and sympathetic to the monarchy in Brazil. His ideas distanced him from the Brazilian positivists, who defended the separation of Church and State and the implantation of a military republic in the country. Two other movements divided Brazil during his years at the Faculty of Law: abolitionism and republicanism.

 Early law career 
Pena graduated with a Law degree on 23 October 1870. The following year, he became a doctor at the same institution, after defending the thesis Letra de Câmbio on 19 June 1871. After turning down an invitation to teach at his alma mater, he returned to Minas Gerais, where he began to work as a lawyer, at first practicing law in his hometown and later in Barbacena. 

There he became known for advocating in defense of slaves and even for helping them escape, for which he came close to being denounced on the court in Rio de Janeiro by a local military officer. Despite this, he was concerned with the economic effects the immediate abolition of slavery could cause; for this reason, he was in favor of compensating slave owners after abolition and also supported immigration as a way to replace slave labor. This brought him closer to other politicians of his time, especially the conservatives, who, according to Cláudia Viscardi, were "responsible for the progressive delay of the end of slavery in Brazil".

 Marriage and family 
Pena married  on 23 January 1875. The couple went on their honeymoon to Rio de Janeiro, where they met emperor Pedro II.

 Political career 

 Parliamentarian and Minister of State (1874–1892) 
Afonso Pena joined the Liberal Party in 1874, beginning his political career that same year after being elected provincial deputy in Minas Gerais. He remained in this office until 1878, after being succesively reelected in 1876 and 1878, when he was elected general deputy, beginning his term in the Chamber of Deputies. His political career was initially sponsored by Martinho Campos and Afonso Celso, two prominent politicians who helped him in his rise in the Liberal Party.

His term in the Chamber of Deputies lasted until 1884, being elected again in 1886 and ramaining there until 1889. During this period, he defended the increase in the number of citizens eligible to vote, based on the reduction of the requirements to do so; even conflicting with his own party. Thus, he defended the adoption of the direct and district vote. He also defended the increase of municipal autonomy, increasingly aligning himself with political and economic liberalism, for which he also supported the non intervention of the State in the economy.

In 1882, he began his experience in executive positions, being appointed Minister of War in the cabinet of prime minister Martinho Campos at the age of 35; Pena was one of only two civilians to hold the office, the other being . Despite this, he was well received by the military, as he defended their freedom of speech and military reforms, which included the Army's professionalization. In the following years, he was Minister of Agriculture, Commerce and Public Works in the cabinet of Lafayette Rodrigues (1883 to 1884), and Interior and Justice in the cabinet of José Antônio Saraiva (1885). However, he reinforced the capture of fugitive slaves and prosecuted the abolitionists who helped them. 

Pena's stance on slavery became ambiguous. He did not own slaves, although this is not certain. However, his political prominence made him abandon his youth abolitionist ideal, as he became increasingly concerned with the economic impacts of abolition and sought to be loyal to his party. Pena accompanied the party in congressional debates regarding slavery; Minas Gerais' congressmen feared abolition could harm the province's economy, which largely relied on coffee. In any case, he later voted in favor of the Golden Law, which finally abolished slavery in Brazil in 1888, but expressed his concerns regarding the effects the law would have.

Despite criticizing nominations based on political affinity, even committing himself to fighting them, Pena could not detach himself from it, as not to harm his political career. That same year, as state councilor, Pena became member of a commission tasked with drafting Brazil's first Civil Code, as the country lacked one. However, the works were interrupted with the coup d'état that abolished the monarchy and proclaimed the republic in Brazil on 15 November 1889.

After the republic was proclaimed, Pena returned to Barbacena, saddened by the banishment of emperor Pedro II. He thought about abandoning politics to resume his law career. Like many other monarchist politicians of his time, he ended up adopting a "resigned acceptance" to the new regime, as he feared any reaction could lead the country to a civil war. Afonso Pena remained a convinced monarchist and continued to defend the figure of emperor Pedro II, whom he considered to be a man of "great knowledge and services".

 State Senator (1892) 
The new republican government, headed by Deodoro da Fonseca, appointed Cesário Alvim as president of Minas Gerais; Alvim did not join the republican movement until late, which caused apprehension on Minas Gerais' so-called "historical republicans". Pena was elected for the position, helping in Minas Gerais' transition from province to state by pacifying its political conflicts and assuming a leading role in the creation of the state's constitution. The constitution granted more autonomy for the municipalities, as Pena had envisioned years before; it also provided for the creation of a new state capital to replace Ouro Preto and a bicameral legislature. The change of the capital from Ouro Preto was the most controversial point; Afonso Pena then proposed to postpone the decision until a commision of specialists presented the new possible locations, which was agreed.

As state senator Pena clashed with the Leopoldina Railway Company, which was the largest railway in Minas Gerais, approving a measure that forced the company to abide by its contract duties or else lose its concession to operate. He also proposed that members of the judiciary be appointed through public competition, instead of personalistic criteria, as had been the case until then; this stance was in line with his preference for personal ability instead of political nominations, although it is not possible to say he did not made nominations based on political criteria rather than individual capacity during his political career. This preference would be reflected in his cabinet when president years later.

Pena defended the expansion of railways in Minas Gerais and the organization of public education. He was against what he called "empregomania", that is, the students' excessive preference, at the time, for public jobs, which consumed public finances. This was also the opinion of other politicians at the time. For this reason he defended technical education. In his own words:

 President of Minas Gerais (1892–1894) 
The first years of the republic in Brazil were plagued by disputes and political instability. Deodoro da Fonseca closed Congress on 3 November 1891 and Pena resigned his position in the constituent assembly in protest. This act distanced him from Alvim and gave him the support of most of Minas Gerais' elite. Tensions were high in the federal government and Deodoro ended up resigning on 23 November 1891, being succeeded by Floriano Peixoto. With the threat of a federal intervention in Minas Gerais, Cesário Alvim resigned in February 1892 and Pena was chosen by consensus of the different political currents in the state to succeed him. Thus, Pena ran for president of Minas Gerais, on a single ticket, becoming the first democratically elected president (governor) of the state by direct vote on 30 June 1892 with a total of 48 thousand votes and taking office on 14 July.

As president of Minas Gerais, Pena opposed the authoritarian government of president Floriano Peixoto and housed his opponents in the state, notably Olavo Bilac and Carlos de Laet. With the outbreak of the Naval Revolt in 1893, admiral Saldanha da Gama, leader of the revolt, consulted the citizens whether they wanted the return of the monarchy or the maintenance of the republic; in response, Afonso Pena published his Manifesto dos Mineiros in the journal , in which he declared:

Thus, despite housing several opponents of the federal government in his state, including monarchists and rebels, who fled persecution by the central government, and disapproving of Floriano Peixoto's actions, Pena urged the people not to join the rebellion, siding with the president against the rebellion, as he deemed it necessary to maintain the country's unity. He went as far as to offer the federal government the help of the Public Force of Minas Gerais, if necessary; this did not mean he supported Floriano Peixoto's stay in power, as he wanted the country's return to civilian rule; in this sense he supported Prudente de Morais' run for the presidency; Morais' became the first civilian president of Brazil. Pena's actions also dissipated the threat of a federal intervention in Minas Gerais.

Pena was the founder of the Free Faculty of Law, in Ouro Preto, on 13 November 1892; he was elected the Faculty's first director and was also a teacher at the institution, lecturing Finance Sciences and Public Accounting. The institution formally began to function on 2 January 1893; a federal decree of 21 February 1893 granted it the status of "free faculty", equating it to official federal institutions. Three students completed the course as early as 1893: Antônio Gomes de Lima, Augusto Cesar Pedreira and Rodolfo Jacob.

On 13 December 1893, the state's legislature met in Barbacena and approved the law that created the city of Belo Horizonte in what was then the old colonial village of Curral d'el Rey, replacing Ouro Preto as the state's capital; the law had been proposed by Afonso Pena. Ouro Preto's geographic features were considered an obstacle to the development of Minas Gerais.

As president of Minas Gerais Afonso Pena also sought to improve the state's economy by solving some of its most immediate issues; these included the loss of income in coffee exports due to the fact that, by being a landlocked state, Minas Gerais' production had to be exported by the port of Rio de Janeiro, which kept the tax revenues. To tackle this issue, Pena created a dry port in the municipality of Juiz de Fora, where most of the state's coffee production was located, and made an agreement with president Floriano Peixoto in which each coffee producing state would keep its production's revenue, thus greatly reducing Minas Gerais' dependency on Rio de Janeiro.

At that time, Pena also defended the taxation of imported goods as a way to promote local production. Ever since his tenure at executive positions in the 1880s, he began to deviate towards a more protectionist stance, in contrast to his early liberal and laissez-faire ideas; in his own words, his position became a "moderate protectionism". He also began to envision the state as a modernizing actor, with the role of promoting economic growth. He later declared that:

Pena also adopted a more proactive state action by promoting immigration to Minas Gerais, in particular , whose immigrants were perceived as skilled labors, necessary for the development of the state; this was in line with the ideas, common at the time, of social darwinisn and racial determinism. The government actions aimed at bringing entire families in order to make their establishment permanent. During the imperial era, Pena had argued against the proposed Chinese immigration, as he deemed it "the introduction of another deleterious element to the many that are in our country" and that it would contribute to the "decay of the race". Despite his efforts, the amount of people that immigrated to Minas Gerais was smaller than other Brazilian states, as they offered better payment and working conditions; the system of indentured servitude, weather and cholera epidemics made Minas Gerais less attractive for immigrants.

 Path to the presidency (1895–1905) 
Pena left the government of Minas Gerais in 1894, being succeeded by Bias Fortes. In 1895, he was appointed president of the Bank of the Republic, the current Bank of Brazil, by president Prudente de Morais. It was the main Brazilian banking institution at the time. Pena remained as president of the bank until 1898. In 1900, he held the position of president of the Deliberative Council of Belo Horizonte, with similar functions to the later established City Council. At the same time, he returned to the state Senate, where he stayed until 1902.

In 1903, Pena was appointed vice president of the Republic by president Rodrigues Alves, following the death of Silviano Brandão, vice president-elect. At the time, the vice presidents exercised, cumulatively, the position of president of the Federal Senate. In the 1906 election, he was the candidate for the presidency of the Republic for the O Bloco coalition, formed by the states of Minas Gerais, Rio Grande do Sul, Bahia and Rio de Janeiro. Pena easily defeated his opponents, president of state  and senator Ruy Barbosa, obtaining 288,285 votes, or 97.92% of the valid votes. Senator Nilo Peçanha, from the same presidential ticket, was elected vice president with 92.96% of the votes.

 Presidency (1906–1909) 

Before taking office, Pena toured the country, traveling over 21,000 kilometers and visiting eighteen state capitals. He became the sixth president of Brazil on 15 November 1906. Despite being elected on the basis of the so-called "coffee with milk politics", he carried out an administration that was not entirely tied to regional interests. He encouraged the creation of railways, and connected the Amazon to Rio de Janeiro by telegraph with Cândido Rondon's expedition.

Pena made the first state purchase of coffee stocks in the Old Republic, thus transferring the burden of coffee value appreciation to the Federal Government, which was previously only practiced regionally by São Paulo, Minas Gerais and Rio de Janeiro, which had signed the Taubaté Agreement. These measures would later result in a period of great prosperity and inflationary control, interrupted with the advent of the First World War. The great influx of foreign capital to Brazil, obtained with the exportation of coffee, and the measures aimed at restricting the expansion of coffee crops adopted in the Taubaté Agreement made it possible to expand the industrial sector during the period. In a industrial census held in 1907, 3,258 companies were counted, which together employed 150,841 factory workers. This census included manufacturing and large industries. However, out of the large factories, 85% were concentrated in São Paulo.

The Pena government modernized the Army and Navy through general Hermes da Fonseca and Alexandrino Faria de Alencar, during which Brazil acquired the Minas Geraes-class battleships kickstarting the South American dreadnought race; and encouraged immigration. His motto was "to govern is to populate", later adopted and expanded by president Washington Luís, who declared: "to govern is to populate; but you cannot populate without opening roads, and of all kinds; to govern is, therefore, to build roads". During his term the first wave of Japanese immigrants arrived in Brazil in the ship Kasato Maru disembarking in the Port of Santos in June 1908.

The ministries during Pena's presidency were held by young politicians who respected his authority. These young ministers were nicknamed "the kindergarten". Pena even declared, in a letter to Ruy Barbosa, that the function of the ministers was to carry out his thinking: "In the distribution of ministries, I did not worry about politics, because that direction falls to me, according to the good rules of the regime. The ministers will carry out my thought. I make the policy."

Pena also modernized Brazilian capitals and ports. During his term the Brazilian National Exposition of 1908 was held in Urca, Rio de Janeiro, featuring pavillions of Brazilian states and Portugal.

Due to his departure from the traditional interests of the oligarchies, in the so-called oligarchic Old Republic, Pena faced a crisis at the time of his succession. David Morethson Campista, nominated by Pena to succeed him in the presidency, was rejected by groups supporting Hermes da Fonseca (mainly by Pinheiro Machado, the most influential congressman at the time). Pena tried to nominate Campos Sales and Rodrigues Alves, without success. In the midst of all this, the  also began, launched by Ruy Barbosa.

 Death 

On 14 June 1909, Pena died at the Catete Palace due to a severe pneumonia, whose symptoms had started the previous month. It was speculated that his death was caused by a "moral trauma" due to the recent death of his son Álvaro and the succession crisis. His wake was held at the government palace and, on 16 June, his body was buried in the São João Batista Cemetery. Nilo Peçanha was immediately sworn in as president.

 Homages 
Pena was honored by giving his name to the city of Penápolis, the city of Conselheiro Pena and the Academic Center of the Faculty of Law of the Federal University of Minas Gerais, CAAP (Afonso Pena Academic Center). As its founder and first director, the faculty itself is affectionately called Vetusta Casa de Afonso Pena'', that is, the Old House of Afonso Pena, by its students, professors and staff, as well as the entire academic and legal community that interacts with it.

In Belo Horizonte, Pena lends his name to the most important avenue in the city. Likewise, in Campo Grande, Mato Grosso do Sul, his name appears on the main avenue. He also lends his name to an important avenue in Porto Velho, Rondônia. He is also honored in São José dos Pinhais, Paraná, naming the city's main airport, Afonso Pena International Airport.

Back to his origins 
On 13 February 2009, the mausoleum and remains of former president Afonso Pena arrived in the historic city of Santa Bárbara. The transfer departed from the São João Batista Cemetery, in Rio de Janeiro, to the old house where he was born.

The monument where Pena's remains were, in Rio de Janeiro, was inaugurated in 1912. It was probably carved in Italy, being built in Carrara marble by Rodolfo Bernardelli, a Mexican-born Brazilian artist at the end of the 19th century. The figure, a woman crying over the three-ton headstone, represents Brazil. The mausoleum's style is eclectic, mixing the neoclassical and art-nouveau styles.

Cabinet 
The composition of Afonso Pena's government was:

Ministers

Presidency organs

Notes

References

Bibliography

External links

Pena, Augusto
Pena, Augusto
Pena, Augusto
Pena, Augusto
Presidents of the Federal Senate (Brazil)
19th-century Brazilian lawyers
University of São Paulo alumni
Pena, Augusto
Liberal Party (Brazil) politicians
Republican Party of Minas Gerais politicians
Coffee with milk politics politicians
Brazilian classical liberals